RK Vojvodina is a Serbian handball club based in Novi Sad. They compete in the Serbian Handball Super League.

History
Founded in 1948, the club won the Serbia and Montenegro Handball Super League and Serbia and Montenegro Handball Cup in the 2004–05 season. They later managed to win eight consecutive Serbian Handball Super League titles between 2013 and 2021.

Management

Team

Current squad 
Squad for the 2022–23 season

Technical staff
 Head Coach:  Boris Rojević
 Assistant Coach:  Dragan Kukić
 Goalkeeping Coach:  Dejan Aničić
 Fitness Coach:  Ilija Medić
 Physiotherapist:  Nenad Babić

Transfers

Transfers for the 2022–23 season

Joining 
  Marin Buneta (RB) from  RD Ribnica
  Miloš Savić (RB) from  HC Holon
  Živan Pešić (LP) from  Hapoel Rishon LeZion
  Miljan Pušica (LB) from  GWD Minden
  Milan Milić (RB) from  RK Zagreb
  Barys Pukhouski (CB) from  SKA Minsk
  Fran Lućin (GK) from  ThSV Eisenach
  Marko Vasić (RW) from  Gyöngyösi KK
  Miloš Grozdanić (LW) from  HSC 2000 Coburg
  Idriss Drissi (GK)

Leaving 
  Svetislav Verkić
  Nemanja Pribak (CB) to  Hapoel Rishon LeZion
  Marin Buneta (RB)
  Idriss Drissi (GK)
  Luka Sević (LP)
  Miloš Savić (RB)
  Marko Tasić (LB)

Previous squads

Honours
Serbia and Montenegro League / Serbian League
 2004–05, 2012–13, 2013–14, 2014–15, 2015–16, 2016–17, 2017–18, 2018–19, 2020–21, 2021–22
Serbia and Montenegro Cup / Serbian Cup
 2004–05, 2005–06, 2010–11, 2014–15, 2018–19, 2019–20, 2020–21
Serbian Super Cup
 2013, 2014, 2015, 2016, 2018, 2019

 Double
 2004–05, 2014–15, 2018–19, 2020–21

EHF ranking

Former club members

Notable former players

  Bojan Beljanski (2020–2021)
  Milan Đukić (2016–2017)
  Uroš Elezović (2013–2015, 2016)
  Aleksandar Gugleta (2015–2016)
  Šandor Hodik (2004–2005, 2009–2010)
  Milan Jovanović (2014–2018)
  Branko Kankaraš (2014)
  Vladimir Mandić (2005, 2008, 2010–2011)
  Dragan Marjanac (2006)
  Filip Marjanović (2014–2016)
  Milan Milić (2022–)
  Milan Mirković (2013–2014, 2018–2019)
  Jovica Nikolić (2017–2022)
  Zoran Nikolić (2013–2016)
  Miloš Orbović (2014–2017)
  Predrag Peruničić (2004–2005)
  Živan Pešić (2016–2017, 2022–)
  Nemanja Pribak (2019–2022)
  Rajko Prodanović (2018–2020)
  Miljan Pušica (2012–2014, 2022–)
  Stevan Sretenović (2019–2020)
  Rastko Stojković (2020)
  Dragan Sudžum (2010–2012)
  Svetislav Verkić (2005–2006, 2018–2022)
  Nenad Vučković (2017–2018)
  Duško Čelica (2018–2019)
  Alen Ovčina (2016–2020)
  Barys Pukhouski (2022–)
  Marin Buneta (2022)
  Sergo Datukashvili (2013–2015, 2016–2018)
  Vuk Lazović (2014–2015)
  Rade Mijatović (1998–2005)
  Mirko Milašević (2004–2006, 2016, 2018–2020)
  Radivoje Ristanović (2005)
  Marko Simović (2017–2019)
  Aleksey Rastvortsev (2015–2016)
  Gregor Ocvirk (2021–)
  Ahmed Bedoui (2021–2022)

Former coaches

References

External links
  
 RK Vojvodina – EHF competition record
 RK Vojvodina at srbijasport.net 

Vojvodina
Handball clubs established in 1948
1948 establishments in Yugoslavia
Sport in Novi Sad